"The Melody Shop" is one of Karl King's most popular marches. The march is written in E♭, with its trio section changing keys to the subdominant A♭ as is typical for marches and polkas. Excerpts of the march are commonly used in auditions for euphoniums and baritone horns auditioning for a spot in a military band, a university band, brass bands, and city and state ensembles. King released this march in 1910.  This was King's first year as a circus musician.

Euphonium part 

This march is popular to many, especially towards euphonium and baritone horn players for its cut time 8th note (16th note) counter melody towards the end of the march. Many ensembles feature a euphonium player or the entire euphonium section at the end of this march; some just have the woodwinds and euphonium players play through it once. Some even repeat break strain and the final strain for euphonium to play the part the first time and both woodwinds and euphonium to play the part together the second time. A few ensembles have the euphonium play the first half and the woodwinds and euphoniums play the second half. Some ensemble directors, if the euphonium section is not ready to take on the part, will either have the woodwinds play the counter melody and have the euphoniums play the first trombone part or simply eliminate the euphonium's part at the end of the piece.

Notes 

March music
1910 compositions
Compositions for brass band
Compositions in E-flat major
Concert band pieces